Shinyō Maru No. 3 (Japanese: 第三 信洋丸) or Sinyo Maru No. 3 (ex-Carmen, ex-Heng Tai, ex-Josho Maru) was an American-built Japanese cargo ship during World War II.

History
She was laid down in 1917 at the Cleveland, Ohio shipyard of the American Ship Building Company for the benefit of Skibs Akties Lodding's Rederi of Norway. She was completed in June 1917 and christened Carmen. In 1927, she was sold to Heng An S.S. (Hengan Steamship Company) of Shanghai and renamed Heng Tai (と改名). In 1928, she was sold to Matsukawa Ryo Shokai (松川菱商会) in Nishinomiya and renamed Josho Maru. In 1933, she was sold to Okada Shosen, K.K./Okada Shipping Co., Ltd. (岡田海運) in Kyoto and renamed Shinyō Maru No. 3 (第三 信洋丸). On 1 March 1944, she was transferred to Daiko Merchant Shipping Co., Ltd. of Osaka after it merged with Okada Shipping. The Lloyd's Register indicates her name was changed to Sinyo Maru in 1939 but Japanese sources do not confirm this.

On 11 June 1945, while traveling un-escorted, the submarine  spotted her and fired four torpedoes, one of which hit.

References

1917 ships
Ships built in the United States
Maritime incidents in June 1945
Ships sunk by American submarines